Deweycheatumnhowe (foaled 12 April 2005) is a champion standardbred racing horse named for the fictional law firm of Dewey, Cheatem & Howe.  He was sired by Muscles Yankee, out of Trolley Square, a Speedy Somolli mare.  The colt is currently owned by Raymond W. Schnittker, Theodore Gewertz, Charles V. Iannazzo, and Deweycheatumnhowe Stable.  As of 28 November 2008, Deweycheatumnhowe had earned $3,095,178 in his career, and has a mark of 1:50.4. His last race was run on November 29, 2008; he had won 22 of the 25 races he had started. Schnittker, as the horse's trainer, described the horse's regimen as a triathlon involving running and swimming along with pulling.

Deweycheatumnhowe's achievements include wins of the 2007 Breeder's Crown, 2007 Valley Victory, the 2007 New Jersey Sires Stakes Final for two-year-old trotting colts, the 2008 Stanley Dancer Memorial, the 2008 Hambletonian, the 2008 World Trotting Derby, the 2008 Canadian Trotting Classic, and the 2008 Kentucky Futurity.  The colt ended his career at the 2008 Breeders Crown, leading most of the race but fading to 3rd down the stretch behind In Focus. The colt will end his career with a record of 22-1-2 in 25 career starts.

It was announced on 8 October 2008 that 'Dewey' would stand at Walnut Hall for the 2009 breeding season. His fee was announced as $25,000 and his book was limited to 140 mares.

Race history

References

2005 racehorse births
American Standardbred racehorses